This is a list of Honduran people:

Politicians
Óscar Acosta
Salvador Aguirre (Honduras)
Juan José Alvarado
José Adolfo Alvarado Lara
Oscar Álvarez
Oswaldo López Arellano
Juan Ángel Arias
Céleo Arias
Juan Ángel Arias Boquín
Miguel Paz Barahona
Francisco Bertrand
Elizabeth Azcona Bocock
Francisco Bográn
Luis Bográn
Policarpo Bonilla
Manuel Bonilla
Francisco Bueso
José Santiago Bueso
José María Bustillo
Miguel Oquelí Bustillo
José Trinidad Cabañas
Tiburcio Carías Andino
Victoriano Castellanos
Juan Alberto Melgar Castro
Coronado Chávez
Vicente Mejía Colindres
Roberto Suazo Córdova
Ramón Ernesto Cruz Uclés
Miguel R. Dávila
Francisco de Aguilar
Dionisio de Herrera
José Azcona del Hoyo
José Cecilio del Valle
Nora Gúnera de Melgar
Juan Francisco de Molina
Francisco Ferrera
Carlos Roberto Flores
Juan Manuel Gálvez
Policarpo Paz García
Mariano Garrigó
Crescencio Gómez
Francisco Gómez (acting president)
José Santos Guardiola
José María Guerrero

Sports
Edgar Álvarez
Eduardo Alonso Arriola Carter
Edwin Yobani Avila
Nahún Avila
Wilfredo Barahona
Mario Beata
Eduardo Bennet
Jefferson Bernárdez
Robel Bernardez
Víctor Bernárdez
Mario René Berríos
Porfirio Armando Betancourt
John Alston Bodden
Mitchel Brown
Samuel Caballero
Ricardo Canales
Juan Manuel Cárcamo
José Cardona
Miguel Castillo
Mauricio Castro
Marvin Chávez
Osman Chávez
Jorge Claros
Reynaldo Clavasquín
Víctor Coello
Denilson Costa
Carlo Costly
Arnold Cruz
José Luis Cruz
José de la Paz Herrera
Julio César de León
Alberth Elis
Donis Escober
Roger Espinoza
Dennis Ferrera
Maynor Figueroa
Milton Flores
Oscar Boniek García
Elkin González
José Luis Grant
Iván Guerrero
Amado Guevara
José Guity
Emilio Izaguirre 
Anthony Lozano
Andy Najar
Wilson Palacios
Carlos Pavón
Arnold Peralta
Romell Quioto
David Suazo
Noel Valladares

Authors
Ramón Amaya Amador
Eduardo Bähr
Augusto Coello
Javier Abril Espinoza

Entertainment (Radio/TV/Film)
Renán Almendárez Coello
Dunia Elvir
Fermin Galeano
America Ferrera
Uncategorized
Juan Ángel Almendares Bonilla
Julieta Castellanos
Leticia de Oyuela
Rony García
Astor Henriquez
Walter Hernández
Yermi Hernández
Francisco Inestroza
Emilio Izaguirre
Júnior Izaguirre
Milton Jiménez
Allan Lalín
Marlon Guillermo Lara Orellana
Ponciano Leiva
Johnny Leverón
Juan Lindo
Porfirio Pepe Lobo
Luis López (footballer, born 1986)
Rafael López Gutiérrez
Walter López (Honduran footballer)
Julio Lozano Díaz
Ricardo Maduro
Ramón Maradiaga
Elmer Marín
Christian Samir Martínez
Emil Martínez
Jairo Martínez
Javier Martínez (footballer, born 1971)
Saul Martínez
Walter Martínez
Rubén Matamoros
Felipe Neri Medina
Héctor Medina
José María Medina
Nery Medina
Ninrod Medina
Carlos Will Mejía
Marcelino Mejía
Merlyn Membreño
Victor Mena
Carlos Mencia
Sergio Mendoza
Roberto Micheletti
David Molina
Salvador Moncada
Oscar Morales
Augusto Monterroso
José Francisco Montes
Elmer Montoya
Donaldo Morales
Junior Morales
Leonardo Morales
Ramón Villeda Morales
Rony Morales
Carlos Morán
Francisco Morazán
Steven Morris
Erick Norales
Milton Núñez
Ramón Núñez
Aguas Santas Ocaña Navarro
Carlos Oliva
Carlos Paez
Wilson Palacios
Carlos Pavón
Francisco Pavón (Honduran footballer)
Limber Perez
Alex Pineda Chacón
Roy Posas
Satcha Pretto
Dania Prince
Adalid Puerto
Luis Ramírez (Honduran footballer)
Rafael Coello Ramos
Carlos Roberto Reina
Milton Reyes
Williams Reyes
Irving Reyna
Rocsi
Luis Rodas
Mario Rodríguez (Honduras)
Rafael Leonardo Callejas Romero
Jaime Rosales
Jaime Rosenthal
Yani Rosenthal
Mauricio Sabillón
Carlos Salgado
Juan Ramón Salgado
Marvin Sánchez
Luis Santamaría
Elvin Ernesto Santos
Elvis Scott
Terencio Sierra
Roberto Sosa (poet)
Marco Aurelio Soto
David Suazo
Julio César Suazo
Maynor Suazo
Hendry Thomas
Reynaldo Tilguath
Vicente Tosta
Danilo Turcios
Ramón Ernesto Cruz Uclés
Fabio Ulloa
Melvin Valladares
Noel Valladares
Érick Vallecillo
Orlin Vallecillo
Steve Van Buren
Domingo Vásquez
Edy Vasquez
Eddy Vega
Wilmer Velásquez
Diego Vigil Cocaña
Franklin Vinosis Webster
George Welcome
Florencio Xatruch
Gilberto Yearwood
Francisco Zelaya y Ayes
Héctor Zelaya
Manuel Zelaya
Xiomara de Zelaya

See also
List of people by nationality